Several rivers are called Cranberry River:

Cranberry River (Maine)
Cranberry River (Massachusetts)
Cranberry River (Michigan)
Cranberry River (West Virginia)
Cranberry River (Wisconsin)
Cranberry River (British Columbia)
Cranberry River (Ontario)

See also
Cranberry (disambiguation)